Jukka Koskinen (born 29 November 1972) is a Finnish former footballer who played as a defender. His clubs included Willem II Tilburg in the Netherlands, Anyang LG Cheetahs of the South Korean K League, Reipas Lahti, MyPa, FC Haka and FC Lahti in Finland.

References
 
 

1972 births
Finnish footballers
Finnish expatriate footballers
Finland international footballers
Association football defenders
Association football midfielders
Living people
Myllykosken Pallo −47 players
Willem II (football club) players
FC Seoul players
FC Haka players
FC Lahti players
Veikkausliiga players
K League 1 players
Expatriate footballers in the Netherlands
Expatriate footballers in South Korea
Reipas Lahti players
Sportspeople from Lahti